The Woman's Tribune was an American newspaper founded in Beatrice, Nebraska, by women's suffrage activist Clara Bewick Colby. In print from 1883 to 1909, and published in Beatrice and in Washington, D.C., the newspaper connected radical feminism with women's culture on the Midwestern frontier. Throughout its run, its slogan was "Equality Before the Law."  Unlike other suffrage papers that focused on urban culture and politics, The Woman's Tribune'''s appeal to the rural and everyday woman made it one of the most powerful voices of feminist ideology during its day. Colby routinely included generalist news, suffrage news, book reviews, travelogues, editorials, and even poetry in the paper. Some stories and features were intended to be read to children, presumably by their mothers, making the Tribune unusual in its explicitly multi-generational audience. Despite lack of financial support from national suffrage organizations, Colby managed to keep the Tribune in production for its 26 years; she wrote, edited, copyedited, and even at times typeset the paper. Advertising focused on products and services provided by and for women. Notices of events in the international suffragist community appeared as well, connecting women on the American frontier to women's suffrage campaigns in Europe and Asia. Colby met and corresponded with Elizabeth Cady Stanton and Susan B. Anthony; she frequently published their work in the Tribune although she received little, if any, financial support from their political organization. Bloomberg has argued that the Woman's Tribune'' was unique among women's suffrage publications in that it argued for full equality under the law for Native and indigenous people (women and men); the core audience of the paper, however, like its founding editor, was in the white, literate middle-class.

References

Publications established in 1893
Publications disestablished in 1909
Women's suffrage publications in the United States
Defunct newspapers published in Nebraska
Nebraska suffrage